Fred Longden (23 February 1894 – 5 October 1952) was a British Labour and Co-operative politician.

Born and brought up in Ashton-under-Lyne, Lancashire, and educated at elementary school, he began work aged 13 as a moulder-apprentice, joining the Moulders' Union in 1914. In the same year he was awarded a place at Ruskin College, Oxford. He also joined the Independent Labour Party and was elected to its National Council.

In the First World War he became active in the Union of Democratic Control, and was arrested for making a speech appealing for immediate peace negotiations.  In 1916 he was offered the chance of exemption from military service on trade and health grounds, but preferred to take his stand as a conscientious objector.  Refused exemption in that category, he was forcibly enlisted, and sentenced to two years imprisonment for disobeying an order; he then accepted the Home Office Scheme, and was transferred to Princetown Work Centre in the erstwhile Dartmoor Prison.

Fred Longden was elected Member of Parliament for Birmingham Deritend, 1929-1931 and 1945–1950, and then in 1950 for Birmingham Small Heath, which he retained until his death in 1952 aged 58.

References 

Who's Who

External links 
 

British conscientious objectors
Independent Labour Party National Administrative Committee members
Labour Co-operative MPs for English constituencies
UK MPs 1929–1931
UK MPs 1945–1950
UK MPs 1950–1951
UK MPs 1951–1955
1890s births
1952 deaths